Calodesma is a genus of tiger moths in the family Erebidae erected by Jacob Hübner in 1820.

Species

 Calodesma albiapex Hering, 1925
 Calodesma amica Stoll, 1781
 Calodesma apicalis Hering, 1925
 Calodesma approximata Hering, 1925
 Calodesma chesalon Druce, 1885
 Calodesma collaris Drury, 1782
 Calodesma contracta Walker, 1854
 Calodesma dilutana Druce, 1907
 Calodesma dioptis Felder, 1874
 Calodesma eucyanoides Hering, 1925
 Calodesma exposita Butler, 1877
 Calodesma itaitubae Hering, 1925
 Calodesma jordani Hering, 1925
 Calodesma kedar Druce, 1900
 Calodesma maculifrons Walker, 1865
 Calodesma plorator Kaye, 1922
 Calodesma quadrimaculata Hering, 1925
 Calodesma rubricincta Dognin, 1923
 Calodesma tamara Hering, 1925
 Calodesma uraneides Butler, 1871

References

External links

 
Pericopina
Moth genera